The Piangil railway line is a 5 ft 3 in gauge (1600 mm) railway line in north-western Victoria, Australia. It branches off the Deniliquin line just north of Bendigo, and runs in a north-westerly direction through Pyramid Hill and Kerang to the border town of Swan Hill, then roughly parallels the New South Wales border to Piangil and Yungera. The line is now open only as far as Piangil, and passenger services only operate to Swan Hill.

History
The line was opened from its junction with the Deniliquin line, just north of Bendigo, to Raywood in 1882. It was progressively extended to Mitiamo in 1883, Pyramid and Kerang in 1884, and Swan Hill in 1890. The line from Swan Hill was extended to Piangil in 1915, Kooloonong in 1920, and Yungera in 1926. The section from Kooloonong to Yungera was closed in 1957, and from Piangil to Kooloonong in 1981. Parts of the former route beyond Piangil, including all of it beyond Kooloonong, are preserved as the Piangil Yungera Railway Bushland Reserve.

The Koondrook branch line, built and operated by the Shire of Kerang, was opened in 1886. It was acquired by the Victorian Railways in 1952 and closed in 1981. Under the 1922 Border Railways Act, a branch opened from Kerang to Murrabit in 1924, which was extended across the New South Wales border at the Murray River to Stony Crossing in 1928. Passenger services on the section beyond Murrabit had ended by 1932, and all services were suspended in 1943. Passenger services to Murrabit had ceased by the end of 1941, and the line to Murrabit closed in 1961.

The last passenger service from Swan Hill to Woorinen, a service for school children that was paid for by the Victorian Education Department and run by a 102hp Walker railmotor, was withdrawn on 17 December 1976. The last passenger service from Swan Hill to Piangil ran on 24 December 1976, again using a 102 hp Walker. Both services were replaced by buses.

Proposed upgrade and extension

In April 2008, it was announced that the Swan Hill – Piangil section of the track, along with six other lines, would be upgraded under a $23.7 million package of improvements to the Victorian core grain network.

In October 2010, the Victorian government released a report into public transport options for the north-west of Victoria, which analysed nine proposals for improving services to the city of Mildura. One alternative investigated was an extension of the railway from Swan Hill to connect to the Mildura railway line at Ouyen.

As part of the Regional Rail Revival program, a new station at Raywood opened on the 17 July 2022.

Passenger services
Some Bendigo V/Line passenger trains extend their services to Eaglehawk on weekdays. Dedicated Swan Hill passenger services serve the remainder of the operating stations on the line, as well as Eaglehawk.

Swan Hill services

Two services operate daily in each direction between Swan Hill and Southern Cross station in Melbourne. In metropolitan Melbourne, services only stop at Watergardens and Footscray stations, setting down passengers only on services to Southern Cross and picking up passengers only on services to Swan Hill. Outside Melbourne, services do not stop at Macedon, Riddells Creek or Clarkefield. Malmsbury is only served by one weekday service to Swan Hill, and Kangaroo Flat is only served on weekdays. All Swan Hill services stop at all other operating stations, both picking up and setting down passengers.

Incidents
On 5 June 2007, a fatal crash occurred when a semi-trailer ran into a train at a level crossing near Kerang. Eleven people died, all of whom were passengers on the train.

References

External links
http://www.vline.com.au
Official map
Statistics and detailed schematic map at the vicsig enthusiast website

Railway lines in Victoria (Australia)
Railway lines opened in 1882
V/Line rail services